Mamurra was a Roman military officer who served under Julius Caesar.

Biography

Early life

Possibly named Marcus Vitruvius Mamurra (if we follow Thielscher's 1969 suggestion based on an inscription in Thibilis), he was an equestrian who originally came from the Italian city of Formiae. His family must have been prominent there, as Horace calls it "the city of the Mamurrae".

His large villa-estate of Gianola is traditionally that which can still be seen near Formia.

Military career

He served as praefectus fabrum (prefect of engineers) under Caesar in Gaul; a poem by Catullus also refers to his service in Britain as well as in Pontus and Hispania, suggesting he also served during the civil war. Among the engineering feats achieved by Caesar's army during this time, which Mamurra may have been a part of, include the rapid construction of a bridge over the Rhine in 55 BC, the designing and building of a new kind of ship for the second expedition to Britain in 54 BC, and the double circumvallation of Alesia in 52 BC.

Mamurra's military service, and his patronage by Caesar, made him extremely rich. According to Cornelius Nepos (quoted by Pliny the Elder) he was the first Roman to have his entire house, which sat on the Caelian Hill, clad in marble, and the first to use solid marble columns. Catullus constructed the character of Mamurra as a foil to himself, that is, as standing for all things un-Roman, and unlike Catullus himself. Catullus attacked Mamurra's profligacy, womanising and scandalous lifestyle, nicknaming him "mentula" (a vulgar word for the penis) and accusing him of having a homosexual relationship with Caesar. This was regarded as a "lasting stain" on Caesar's character, but Catullus later apologised, and was immediately invited to dinner by Caesar. Catullus also refers in unflattering terms to Ameana, the mistress of "the bankrupt of Formiae", usually taken to mean Mamurra.

Later
A letter of Cicero of 45 BC refers to Caesar giving no visible reaction when he heard news of Mamurra, which has been interpreted by some as referring to his death, although the reference is too ambiguous to be certain.

See also
 Homosexuality in ancient Rome

References

External links
 Catullus poem

1st-century BC Romans
Ancient Roman equites
Ancient Roman politicians
Ancient Roman soldiers
Ancient Romans involved in Julius Caesar's invasions of Britain
People from Formia
Roman people of the Gallic Wars
Military personnel of Julius Caesar
Lovers of Julius Caesar